Local bodies in Tamil Nadu constitute the three tier administration set-up in the South Indian state of Tamil Nadu. It is a system of local government which forms the last level from the Centre. Chennai Corporation (now in Tamil Nadu) in the then Madras Presidency, established in 1688, is the oldest such local body not only in India but also in any commonwealth nations outside United Kingdom.

History 
The history of local bodies in Tamil Nadu dates back to the Ancient period wherein the village administration was taken care by a Village assembly known as Sabai in every village. Further, each village was divided into several wards known as mandalams. This is evident from the epigraph inscriptions found in Vaikuntha Perumal Temple near Uthiramerur. They used the pot-ticket system of election (Kudavolai Murai) to elect representatives to the assembly.

Later came the British rule in India in which the centralisation of governance was enforced. People in the interior of the villages had to walk up to the central authorities for their obligations and grievances. Anyhow this system faded out as the British government realised the pitfalls in this system. Laudable efforts of Ripon brought legislation in this aspect which created unions in small towns and villages, to facilitate proper sanitation and lighting. Later, councils were constituted in this regard for which the members are directly elected by elections. Councils were made accountable to an Inspector and Chairman. Though urbanisation was less prevalent those days, Chennai (erstwhile Madras) had the honour of having such Municipal Corporation status even in 1688. Urban local bodies known Municipalities were in existence. The Local and Municipal Department was functioning in the then Secretariat from 1916. It had local, municipal, plague, medical and legislative branches.

Independent India heard many voices for the revival and strengthening of the Village panchayats, Mahatma Gandhi insisted upon this for achieving Swaraj completely covering all the corners of this country. Later, a committee set up by Government of India, popularly known Balwant Rai Mehta Committee committee suggested the formation of three-tier Panchayati Raj system. From then, there came many legislation to ensure effective system of Local governance in Tamil Nadu. Notable legislative orders to Local Bodies by the centre-state governments include:

 Article 40 of Indian Constitution
 Madras Village Panchayat Act, 1950
 Tamil Nadu District Municipalities (Amendment) Act, 1950
 Tamil Nadu Panchayats Act, 1958
 Tamil Nadu District Development Councils Act, 1958
 Tamil Nadu Panchayats Act, 1994 (ratification to 73rd and 74th Amendment of the Constitution of India)

Overview
Developmental administration is the main objective of these local bodies. They are effected by the means of urban and rural local bodies. They are responsible for the implementation of various centrally sponsored, state-funded, and externally aided schemes for provision of basic amenities and other services to the people. Elections are held to elect the representatives for local body council in respective urban and rural areas every five years. The Ministry of Municipal Administration and Rural Development, Government of Tamil Nadu is the state government governing body for local bodies which is headed by a Minister who is an elected member of the Tamil Nadu Legislative Assembly.

Administrative units
Local bodies are categorised into Urban Local Bodies and Rural Local Bodies. This classification is rooted in terms of living standards in the context of urban and rural agglomeration.

Urban Local Bodies
The urban local bodies act as platform between the people in the urban areas and the administration. According to 2011 census of India, Tamil Nadu has about 48.45% of total population living in urbanised areas. Depending on the population and income of the urban local bodies, they are further classified into three categories.

City Municipal Corporations
Municipalities
Town Panchayat

Larger cities of Tamil Nadu are governed by City Municipal Corporations. Tamil Nadu has 21 municipal corporations: Chennai, Coimbatore, Madurai, Tiruchirappalli, Salem, Tiruppur, Erode, Tirunelveli, Vellore, Thoothukudi, Dindigul, Thanjavur, Hosur, Nagercoil, Avadi, Tambaram, Kanchipuram, Cuddalore, Karur, Kumbakonam and Sivakasi These cities alone house one-third of urban population of the state. Corporation consists of a council of elected councillors from each ward and a presiding officer, Mayor who is also an elected representative. Apart from them, an executive authority referred as Corporation Commissioner is also vested with administrative powers.

Municipalities fall next to the City Municipal Corporations. There are about 138 Municipalities in Tamil Nadu. Municipalities have four categories based on their annual income and population:
 - Special-grade municipalities - 8
 - Selection-grade municipalities - 28
 - Grade I municipalities - 34
 - Grade II municipalities - 68 
. Their elected representatives include ward councillors and a presiding officer, Municipal Chairperson. Municipal Commissioner is the executive authority.

Town Panchayat is the body of government for areas in transition form ‘rural’ to ‘urban’. Tamil Nadu is the first state to introduce such a classification in urban local bodies. The state has 489 town panchayats. Town panchayats are upgraded to Grade III municipalities if they are found to be eligible. They are categorised in a similar way to that of Municipalities depending on the income criteria and population. Town panchayat council include elected ward councillors and their presiding officer, Town panchayat chairperson. Executive Officer is the executive authority as in the case of town panchayats.

Rural Local Bodies
Rural local bodies include the panchayat raj institutions of this state. There are three levels in this system as follows.

Village panchayats
Panchayat unions (coterminous with blocks)
District panchayats in this state

Village panchayats form the grass-root level of democracy as they form the local government for the basic building blocks of India - villages. It is set up in villages where the population is more than 300. There are about 12,524 Village panchayats in this state. Gram Sabha is a part of Village panchayat which consists of all residents of village. Village panchayat president himself/herself is an executive authority here. They must meet for minimum of four times a year.

Panchayat Unions (coterminous with blocks) is the group of Village panchayats. They serve as the link between the villages and the district administration. They form the local government at the Taluk level. Tamil Nadu has 388 panchayat unions. Panchayat Union council consists of elected ward members from the villages. It is headed by a panchayat union chairperson, who is elected indirectly by the ward members of the council.

District panchayats in this state form the cream of the panchayat raj system. They take the top slot with mainly advisory powers to the rest. Developmental administration of the district in rural areas are in its hands. It consists of ward members elected from various villages in its jurisdiction. It is presided by a district panchayat chairperson, who is indirectly elected by its ward members. There are 31 district panchayats in this state except for the district of Chennai as it is an urban district. District collector is the ex-officio chairman of the District rural development agency.

District details

Elections

Elections to the local bodies in Tamil Nadu, held once in five years, are conducted by Tamil Nadu State Election Commission. Both direct and indirect elections apply for local bodies. Direct election posts include:

 Urban bodies
 Corporation Mayor
 Municipality/Town Panchayat Chairperson
 Corporation/Municipality/Town Panchayat Councillor
 Rural bodies
 Village Panchayat President
 District Panchayat councillor
 Panchayat Union councillor
 Village Panchayat Ward Member

Indirect election posts include (Mayor,Deputy Mayor of corporations)(Chairpersons and vice chairpersons of  

Municipalities and Town panchayats, District panchayats and Panchayat union Various statutory/standing committees are also elected by the way of indirect elections.

Functions
Local bodies are completely responsible for the developmental administration in the state. Maintenance of clean environment, primary health facilities gain the foremost importance. Apart from them water supply, roads and buildings, storm-water drains, street lighting, solid waste management, sanitation and bus-stands cum commercial complexes etc are the prime duties of the local bodies. Centrally sponsored schemes like Mahatma Gandhi National Rural Employment Guarantee Scheme (MGNREGS), Indira Awaas Yojana (IAY), Member of Parliament Local Area Development Scheme (MPLADS), etc, and State-funded Schemes like Tamil Nadu Village Habitation Improvement Scheme (THAI), Member of Legislative Assembly Constituency Development Scheme (MLACDS), Self-Sufficiency Scheme, Solar-Powered Green-House Scheme are also undertaken by the local bodies.
Source of revenue for these local bodies are mainly from centre-state governments. Local bodies also have the power of taxation which include house tax, profession tax, property tax etc. Apart from these they levy fees for specific building plan and layout approvals, water charges, sewerage charges etc.

See also
List of Developmental administrative units of Tamil Nadu

References

External links
Govt. of Tamil Nadu - official Sste
Rural Development and Panchayat Raj Department, Govt. of Tamil Nadu
Municipal Administration and Water Supply Department, Govt. of Tamil Nadu

 
Government of Tamil Nadu
Tamil Nadu